Fageicera is a genus of spiders in the family Ochyroceratidae. It was first described in 1992 by Dumitrescu & Georgescu. , it contains 3 species, all from Cuba.

References

Ochyroceratidae
Araneomorphae genera
Spiders of the Caribbean
Endemic fauna of Cuba